ARA Petrel was a hydrographic survey boat of the Argentine Navy, built in the Cadenazzi Shipyard and based in Buenos Aires. The vessel is named after the petrel, a seabird that inhabits Argentina’s littoral, and is the third Argentine naval ship with this name.

Design 

Petrel was a coastal and fluvial research ship designed by the engineering team at Cadenazzi Shipyard, where it was built. 

It was powered by two diesel engines driving two propellers.

History 

Petrel was built in the Cadenazzi Shipyard, in Tigre, Buenos Aires. Commissioned by the Argentine Navy in July 1965, she was assigned to the  Naval Hydrographic Service ( Servicio de Hidrografía Naval). 

She undertook several campaigns, which included sounding, current measuring, water sampling and bottom sampling; same as the survey launch  Cormorán. 

As of late 2015, Petrel has been decommissioned.

References

Notes

Bibliography

Other sources

See also 
 List of auxiliary ships of the Argentine Navy

Further reading 

Research vessels of Argentina
Ships built in Argentina
1965 ships
Survey ships